Alexandros Tatsis or Alekos Tatsis (born 28 August 1979) is a retired Greek football player.

Career

Tatsis signed his first professional contract with PAS Giannina. He joined Proodeftiki F.C. in 2002, and played for the club during the 2002–03 Alpha Ethniki season.
In 2003 he joined Olympiacos, but he was released at the end of the season.

References

1979 births
Living people
Greek footballers
PAS Giannina F.C. players
Proodeftiki F.C. players
Olympiacos F.C. players
Association football forwards
Doxa Kranoula F.C. players
Footballers from Ioannina